Parotocinclus bidentatus is a species of catfish in the family Loricariidae. It is a freshwater species native to South America, where it occurs in the Paraíba do Sul basin in Brazil. The species reaches 3.8 cm (1.5 inches) SL.

References 

Loricariidae
Otothyrinae
Fish described in 2005
Freshwater fish of Brazil